The Atomic Energy Central School is a chain of schools run by the AEES, Mumbai, India, developed for the children of employees of the Department of Atomic Energy (DAE), India.

List of schools

Anupuram
 AECS Anupuram

Hyderabad
 AECS Hyderabad 1
 AECS Hyderabad 2

Indore
 AECS Indore

Jaduguda
 AECS-1 Jaduguda
 AECS-2 Jaduguda

Kaiga
 AECS Kaiga

Kakrapar
 AECS Kakrapar

Kalpakkam
 AECS-1 Kalpakkam
 AECS-2 Kalpakkam

Kudankulam
 AECS Kudankulam

Manuguru
 AECS Manuguru

Mumbai
 AECS-1 Mumbai
 AECS-2 Mumbai
 AECS-3 Mumbai
 AECS-4 Mumbai
 AECS-5 Mumbai
 AECS-6 Mumbai
 AEJC Mumbai

Mysore
 AECS Mysore

Narora
 AECS Narora

Narwapahar
 AECS Narwapahar

OSCOM
 AECS OSCOM

Pazhayakayal
 AECS Pazhayakayal

Rawatbhata
 AECS-2 Rawatbhata
 AECS-3 Rawatbhata
 AECS-4 Rawatbhata

Tarapur
 AECS-1 Tarapur
 AECS-2 Tarapur
 AECS-3 Tarapur

Turamdih
 AECS Turamdih

Notable alumni

 Suryakumar Yadav
Shreya Ghoshal
 Parag Agrawal
 Lalchand Rajput

References

External links
 Atomic Energy Education Society

High schools and secondary schools in Hyderabad, India
Central Board of Secondary Education
1988 establishments in India
High schools and secondary schools in Mumbai
Schools in Uttara Kannada district
High schools and secondary schools in Mysore